The 1975 Rice Owls football team was an American football team that represented Rice University in the Southwest Conference during the 1975 NCAA Division I football season. In their fourth year under head coach Al Conover, the team compiled a 2–9 record.

Schedule

Roster

References

Rice
Rice Owls football seasons
Rice Owls football